Ariadna Thalía Sodi Miranda (born 26 August 1971), known mononymously as Thalía, is a Mexican singer and actress. Referred to as the "Queen of Latin Pop", she is considered one of the most successful and influential Mexican artists. Having sold around 50 million records worldwide, she is one of the best-selling Latin music artists of all-time. Aside from her native Spanish, Thalía has also sung in English, French, Portuguese and Tagalog.

She has received numerous accolades, including five Billboard Latin Music Awards, eight Lo Nuestro Awards, as well as seven Latin Grammy Award nominations and their special "President's Merit Award" in 2019. She has collaborated with multiple artists, such as Tony Bennett, Michael Bublé, Robbie Williams, Marc Anthony, Laura Pausini, Romeo Santos, Maluma, Fat Joe, and Carlos Vives.

As an actress, Thalía starred in a variety of successful telenovelas that aired in over 180 countries with an estimated audience of 2 billion people according to UNICEF, which led to her being referred to as the "Queen of telenovelas" by the mass media. The global impact of her novelas helped her to popularize her music in non-Spanish speaking territories and markets in Europe and Asia. The Mexican media company Televisa has named her the best-paid telenovela actress in history, while Billboard names her the most widely recognized Spanish-speaking soap star in the world.

Considered a Latin pop icon, Thalía was included in Billboards Greatest Latin Artists of All Time in 2020 and People En Españols The 100 most iconic Hispanic entertainers of all time in 2008. On 5 December 2013, she was honored with a star on the Hollywood Walk of Fame as a recognition for her achievements in the music industry. As a businesswoman, Thalía enjoyed success with a fashion brand (having signed a deal with Macy's), as well she had her own nationally syndicated radio show and is the author of four books, including her memoir. During her career, Thalía has been involved in humanitarian causes and is an UNICEF Mexico Ambassador since 2016.

Early life

Thalía was born on 26 August 1971 in Mexico City. She is the youngest of five daughters of Yolanda Miranda Mange (d. 2011), a painter who was Thalía's manager from 1980 to 1999 and Ernesto Sodi Pallares (d. 1977), a scientist, doctor of pathology, criminologist and writer. Her father's paternal grandfather, who was born in Florence, Italy, emigrated to Mexico during the Italian diaspora. Her four sisters are Laura Zapata (daughter of Guillermo Zapata Pérez de Utrera), Federica, Gabriela and Ernestina Sodi.

When she turned one, Thalía appeared in her first TV commercial in Mexico. At the age of four, she began taking ballet and piano classes at the Conservatorio Nacional de Música (Mexico). Her father suffered from diabetes and died in 1977 when Thalía was six years old.

Years later, Thalía admitted publicly that her father's death had traumatized her drastically, since she had lost her voice for a whole year. This led to her being diagnosed with childhood disintegrative disorder (CDH), which belongs to a series of developmental disorders related to autism spectrum. She has said that she had psychological therapy for a few years. She has reportedly mentioned that she was a victim of bullying as a child because of the loss of her father.

Thalía attended Lycée Franco-Mexicain elementary school, where she learned to speak French fluently at a very young age. In 1976, a year before her father's death, she had a guest appearance in the Mexican film La guerra de los pasteles ("War of Cakes"), although her name doesn't appear in the film credits.

Music career

1981–1989: Career beginnings and the Timbiriche era
In 1981, when Thalía was nine years old, she was incorporated as a vocalist in a children's group named Pac Man, which was formed to participate in a popular music festival known as Juguemos a cantar ("Let's play like we're singing"), a TV program by Televisa. Later, Pac Man changed their band name to "Din-Din". Thalía performed various times along with Din-Din in occasional events and parties, touring all over Mexico. The band recorded a total of 4 studio albums between 1982 and 1983 (En acción, Recordando el Rock and Roll, Somos alguien muy especial and Pitubailando), and later it was disbanded.

After Din-Din broke up in 1984, Thalía participated as a solo artist in two annual music festivals of Juguemos a cantar. In 1984, she placed second there with her interpretation of "Moderna niña del rock" ("Modern rock girl"); this brought her the opportunity to participate in the chorus of the popular musical Vaselina, a child version of the successful musical Grease, in which the band Timbiriche was acting and singing. The line-up of the band consisted of Sasha Sökol, Benny Ibarra, Erik Rubín, Diego Schoening, Mariana Garza and Paulina Rubio. Timbiriche was highly promoted at the time by Televisa, one of the most massive media enterprises globally and the most important in the Spanish-speaking world. Some time later, Thalía obtained the protagonist role of Sandy Dee in the musical, and she performed in 500 theater presentations of Vaselina along with Timbiriche.

In 1986, after the departure of Sasha Sökol from Timbiriche, Thalía became a member of the band. By that time, Timbiriche had already recorded five albums. In 1987, she made her TV acting debut in an episode of the telenovela Pobre señorita Limantour. In the same year, she recorded with Timbiriche the principal theme of the juvenile telenovela Quinceañera ("Fifteen-year-old"), in which Thalía was the co-protagonist with the role of Beatriz. The TV series was awarded as the "Best telenovela" by "Premios TVyNovelas" in 1988 and Thalía was awarded as "the best new actress of 1988".

With Timbiriche, Thalía recorded four studio albums: Timbiriche VII (1987), the double album Timbiriche VIII & IX (1988) and Los clásicos de Timbiriche (1989). The last one is a compilation of the band's greatest hits, recorded originally in 1987, with new symphonic arrangements as it included the participation of Mexico's philharmonic orchestra. In 1989, Thalía departed from Timbiriche. In that year, she also starred in another TV series, Luz y sombra ("Light and shadow"), which was her first protagonist role. Some time later she visited Los Angeles to take English courses in the University of California. She also attended music, singing, acting and dancing classes before beginning her career as a solo artist.

1990–1993: First albums as a solo artist
In 1990, Thalía returned to Mexico and released her first studio album as a solo artist, self-titled  Thalía, which was produced by Alfredo Díaz Ordaz, and published by Fonovisa, Televisa's record label. From that album, she released a total of four singles that became radio hits: "Amarillo Azul", "Pienso en Ti", "Un Pacto Entre los Dos" and "Saliva". The last two tracks were co-written by her and Díaz Ordaz and they were considered as provocative at the time ("Un Pacto Entre Los Dos" was even labeled as a song with occult Satan-worship lyrics by various far-right parties).

In September 1991, Thalía released her second studio album, Mundo de cristal, which marks Thalía's last project in collaboration with Alfredo Díaz Ordaz. Four songs became radio singles from the album, and all of them had big radio impact in Mexico. Due to the success of the singles, the album was certified as double gold in Thalía's native country, Mexico. In the same year, Thalía was co-presenter of the late Spanish show VIP Noche, along with Spanish presenter Emilio Aragón, produced by Telecinco.

In October 1992, she released her third studio album and her last under the same label, entitled Love, which was recorded in Spain and was produced by Luis Carlos Esteban. The album spread six singles, that had huge radio impact: "Sangre", "Love", "María Mercedes" (official theme of the TV series), "No Trates de Engañarme", "Flor de Juventud", and "La Vida en Rosa" (La vie en rose), the last one being a Spanish-French cover of the classic French song originally performed by Edith Piaf. Thalía wrote the song "Sangre" inspired in Díaz Ordaz, with whom she had broken up her sentimental relation. The album was praised by the critics, as it was an artistic evolution for Thalía, who experimented for the first time in different music genres, especially electronic music. The album reached number 15 on Billboard's Latin Pop Albums in 1993. In Mexico, it sold over 200,000 copies in the first month upon its release and very soon it reached the platinum and gold certification, while it was a commercial success all over Latin America. Thalia got the opportunity to be on stage with Michael Jackson during the Dangerous World Tour in all the Mexico City concerts.

1994–1999: International breakout
In 1994, during the successful transmission of Marimar, Thalía signed a contract with the record label EMI to prepare her fourth studio album that was entitled En éxtasis. The album was released in October 1995. En éxtasis was produced with the aid of celebrated producers such as Emilio Estefan, Jr. (husband of the famous Cuban singer Gloria Estefan) and Óscar López. The album spawned a total of seven singles including "Piel morena", "Amándote", "María la del barrio", "Quiero hacerte el amor", "Gracias a Dios, "Me Faltas Tú" and "Lágrimas". Piel morena became a huge international hit apart from being voted as the best Spanish song ever in the United States from a poll released by mass media company Univision. It must also be added that Thalía was more oriented to the latin pop music genre in that album, even though it was influenced by various music genres. Amandote became a number 1 hit in various radio stations in the Philippines in 1996, along with her phenomenal superstardom accompanied by her historic Manila tour. It was described by Philippine media as tantamount to that of Pope John Paul II's 1995 Manila visit.
The broadcast of the telenovelas María Mercedes, Marimar and María la del barrio had already converted Thalía to a global television phenomenon by the end of 1996. In January 1997, she released her first compilation album entitled Nandito Ako, which contains four songs recorded in Filipino, five English versions from various tracks from the album En éxtasis and a Spanish remix of the song Amándote. The only single that was released from this album was Nandito Ako. The album became a commercial success in the Philippines as a result of Thalía's growing popularity, reaching platinum status set by the Philippine Association of the Record Industry. En éxtasis was her first album that was released worldwide, reaching gold, platinum or multi-platinum status in more than 20 countries.

In July 1997, Thalía's fifth studio album was released, under the title Amor a la mexicana, produced again by Emilio Estefan, and including songs that became classic over the years like "Mujer Latina", "De dónde soy", "Por amor", "Noches sin luna" and "Amor a la mexicana". The album became a pure commercial success, while the first single of the album ("Amor a la mexicana") became a number one hit in 14 countries. With Amor a la mexicana, Thalía was able to bring her music and establish her projects in difficult markets like those of France, Belgium, Switzerland, Greece, Hungary, Turkey, Poland, Portugal, Italy and all the Spanish-speaking countries.

After the success of Amor a la mexicana, Thalía recorded the Spanish and Portuguese versions of the song "Journey to the Past", produced by Atlantic Records, as a part of the soundtrack of the Fox Animation Studios movie Anastasia (1997).

In the following year, she starred for the first time in a movie in English, named "Mambo Café", written and directed by Reuben González. Mambo Café premiered in January 2000 in Mexico, Greece and Russia, distributed by Kushner Locke Entertainment.

In 1999, after Mambo Café, Thalía returned in television with telenovela Rosalinda. "Rosalinda" was considered to be Televisa's most expensive production ever by that time, as well as the most exported in foreign countries, as it was sold in over 180 countries. In an interview of that period Thalía had commented: "The telenovelas are the ones that opened the doors of the world for me, because the audience of telenovelas is much more passionate than the audience of cinema. What's more, television is free".

2000–2005: Crossover and first tour in the United States
Emilio Estefan also produced Thalía's sixth studio album, Arrasando, released on 25 April 2000, which was successful. It spawned the singles "Entre el mar y una estrella", "Regresa a mí", "Arrasando" and "Reencarnación". Thalía was nominated in the Latin Grammy category as the "Best Female Pop Vocal Album". The album received one Latin Grammy nomination and it won in its category as the "Best Sound Engineered Album of the year". The singles of this album were huge hits. In 2001 she was nominated for her record Arrasando and won a Lo Nuestro award in the category of People's Prize, and was the first artist to whom an innovative award from Billboard Awards for Latin Music was given, the "Star Award".

On 4 May 2001, the President of the United States, George W. Bush, invited her to a party celebrating Cinco de mayo organized at the White House, where she interpreted a medley of popular Mexican songs with a Mexican mariachi band.

On 28 August 2001, expressing her love for her country of birth, Mexico, she released her album Con Banda: Grandes Éxitos: a "greatest hits" album, but recorded with the typical Mexican "banda" sound. "Amor a la Mexicana" banda version was released as a single. The album was nominated for a Latin Grammy for "Best Banda Album" at the 3rd Annual Latin Grammy Awards in 2002.

Her seventh studio album, self-titled Thalía, was released on 21 May 2002. It was largely written and produced by Estéfano. Buoyed by a pair of chart-topping singles ("Tú y Yo" and "No me enseñaste") and a top-ten hit ("¿A quién le importa?") (cover of Alaska y Dinarama), this album hit number one for 6 consecutive weeks on the Top Latin Albums chart, reaching number eleven on the Billboard 200 chart and 2x Multi-Platinum status with sales in the U.S. of 200,000 copies. It was nominated in one Latin Grammy category – "Female Pop Vocal Album", and in four Latin Billboard categories – "Pop Track Female" and "Tropical Track Female" for "No Me Enseñaste", "Your World Award", and "Female Pop Album", for Thalía, winning the last two awards. "No Me Enseñaste" reached at No. 1 in Billboard's Hot Latin Tracks chart.

On 25 February 2003, she released her first remix album, Thalía's Hits Remixed. This album contains some remixes of her EMI era hits, such as "Amor a la Mexicana", "Piel Morena", "No Me Enseñaste" and "Tú y Yo." It also contains the English version of "Arrasando", called "It's My Party". Furthermore, it includes the previously unreleased medley that Thalía had recorded especially for her 2001 Latin Grammy Awards performance, but was later cancelled, due to the September 11 attacks.

On 8 July 2003, Thalía released her eighth studio album and the first one in English, the self-titled Thalía, featuring the rapper Fat Joe in "I Want You/Me Pones Sexy". "Baby, I'm in Love/Alguien Real", "Don't Look Back" and "Cerca De Ti" were singles too. The album landed at No. 11 in The Billboard 200. The song "I Want You" entered the American Top 40 with Casey Kasem and even reached the top 10 during that year. The song also entered the American Billboard Top 100 Singles Charts that year. She won an International Dance Music Award for her club-hit "Dance Dance (The Mexican)".

On 10 February 2004, Thalía released her first official Greatest Hits album, and "Cerca de ti" and "Acción y Reacción" were the singles from this album. In April and May, she toured USA and Mexico with her "High Voltage Tour".

Her ninth studio album, El Sexto Sentido, was released on 19 July 2005, and recorded mostly in Spanish, but with a few of the songs sung in English as well. It was reported to be the most expensive music album produced in Latin America in 2005. It had mild success, although the sound and the overall result make it one of her most integrated projects. "Amar sin ser amada" was the first single of the album and is considered as an infectious rock-edged tango-based song. "Un alma sentenciada", the second single of the album, is a feverish and, at points, hyperdramatic ballad. The explosive "Seducción" ("Seduction") and "Olvidame" were also released as singles, gaining considerable success. The album was also certified gold in Argentina, Greece and Mexico and double platinum in the United States.

2006–2008: The Conexión Thalía Radio Show, Lyme disease and Lunada
In 2006, the album received a reloaded version, El Sexto Sentido: Re+Loaded. Thalía was the 'godmother' of Cantando Por Un Sueño, a Mexican TV reality show. It was rumored she got paid 1 million dollars to perform. Thalía recorded the title song of the show, and it was included in the album. It was released in Mexico on 13 February 2006 (U.S. 6 June, Spain 29 May) and features four new songs, including a duet with the group Aventura, "No, No, No" which become a massive hit. "El Sexto Sentido" was nominated for one Latin Grammy as "Best Female Pop Vocal Album", it was also nominated in one Latin Billboard category – "Pop Female Album" and in eight Premios Juventud categories.

In 2006, Thalía became a U.S. citizen at a swearing-in ceremony in New York, where she resides with her husband. Under Mexican law she is allowed to retain her Mexican citizenship. She also received an award by her then record company EMI, for sales of more than 10 million copies with all her discography with the company.

In March 2007, Thalía also joined ABC Radio to start The Conexión Thalía Radio Show, where she talks about music, fashion, news and political issues.

Afterwards, she was named one of the 50 Most Beautiful People in People en Español 2008 for a record-breaking seventh time where they called her their "Queen". She was once again featured in the 2010 edition for an eighth time.

In May 2008, Thalía's single "Ten Paciencia", was premiered on the internet. Although, the single received a lukewarm response and did not perform well in the U.S. charts and Top 20 hits in Mexico, it was No. 1 in several countries of Latin America. Furthermore, her tenth studio album Lunada, was released on 24 June 2008, and debuted at number eight in Mexico and peaked at number ten on the Billboard Top Latin Albums (U.S). It was the last Thalía's studio album released by EMI.

Thalía later appeared on El Show De Cristina, aired in late July by Univision's Spanish network to promote the album. According to Univision network, her appearance on the show received huge ratings, reaching No. 1 in both the Chicago and Miami markets. The show was said to have been viewed by over 87 million people in the US alone.

"Será porque te amo", the second single, received no promotion and became another failed single. It is a Spanish language cover version of the Italian hit "Sarà perché ti amo", originally performed by the group Ricchi e Poveri.

On 23 October, it was announced that Thalía was suffering from Lyme disease, which is transmitted by ticks. Fortunately, it was discovered quickly, and the singer, as well as her mother, Yolanda Miranda, were able to receive antibiotics in time. On 18 November, Thalía announced the end of her collaboration with EMI Music.

Despite Lunada being a commercial disappointment, it was named as the "Best Album of the Year" by ¡Hola! readers. The latest work of the Mexican singer achieved 8,750 votes beating artists, such as Luis Miguel, Britney Spears, Mariah Carey, Beyoncé and Madonna.

2009–2011: Success of Primera Fila and Growing Stronger
On 30 July 2009, Thalía recorded her acoustic album, Primera fila, her first album after she signed with Sony Music Entertainment. In October, Thalía performed at the White House, along with other Latin singers, in an event organized by President Barack Obama that celebrated Hispanic heritage. Thalía's performance was iconic and historic, as she was the first celebrity to publicly invite a United States President to dance.

In October of the same year, she released the first single from Primera fila, a song named Equivocada. In December Thalía released her album, which contained duets with Joan Sebastian and Pedro Capó and various other songs, that became huge radio hits in the following months. The production received critical accept and very positive reviews, while Jason Birchmeier stated that "Primera Fila" was one of the best albums Thalía has released in her whole career, and definitely the one with the most surprises. As for Thalía, she considered Primera Fila as "the most personal album" in her career.

Regarding to the album's commercial performance, Primera fila received diamond and triple platinum sales certifications in Mexico, where it was announced by the end of 2011 that the album had sold over 500,000 copies according to AMPROFON. Primera fila was the best selling album in Mexico in 2010, where it topped the charts for 55 non-consecutive weeks, the most weeks ever in Mexico's recorded music chart history. In Greece and Spain, the album reached the positions No. 6 and No. 32, respectively, while it reached No. 4 in Billboard's top Latin Albums and No. 2 in Billboard's Latin Pop Albums charts. Initially, Primera Fila had reached No. 1 on both aforementioned charts, but sales of the standard edition and the Walmart edition were later divided, leading to a retraction and update to Billboard's official peak positions for Primera Fila. After these changes, Primera fila went from a peak position of No. 167 to a peak position of No. 198 on the Billboard 200 albums chart. Until the month of October 2012, Primera fila had sold over 1.5 million copies worldwide.

In September 2010, Thalía released a special anniversary edition of the album under the title Primera fila... Un año después, which included 8 songs from the original album, as well as 2 never-released before songs, 2 remixes and a DVD with a documentary of the recording process of the album. In October 2010, Michael Bublé invited her to record a song with him in his holiday album Christmas. Together they recorded the bilingual song "Mis Deseos/Feliz Navidad" and their collaboration received very positive reviews.

2012–2013: Habitame Siempre and VIVA! Tour
Thalía had a collaboration with US music veteran Tony Bennett for his "Viva:Duets" album, which was released on 22 October 2012. Together they performed live the classic song "The way you look tonight" in Today's show and the Katie Couric's show.

During the past months, she had announced that she was recording her eleventh studio album, Habítame siempre. On 21 September 2012, Thalía gave a private concert in New York City at Hammerstein Ballroom as a preview of the upcoming album. The album's lead single, "Manías", was released on 8 October 2012. Habítame siempre was released on 19 November 2012, in the United States and Latin America under the label of Sony Music Latin, while in Europe it is set to be released in 2013 by BMG Music. The album contains collaborations with Robbie Williams, Michael Bublé, Prince Royce and Gilberto Santa Rosa, among others and immensely after its release, it received mostly positive reviews. Habitame Siempre was certified triple platinum plus gold in Mexico for sales of more than 210,000 copies, gold in the United States for shipments exceeding 50,000 copies and platinum in Venezuela for over 10,000 copies shipped. In the meantime the second single of the album, "Te Perdiste Mi Amor", was certified platinum in Mexico for digital sales of over 60,000 copies.

On 24 March 2013, Thalía launched her VIVA! Tour in support of Habítame Siempre. The VIVA! Tour marks Thalía's first tour in a decade and consists of a series of intimate concerts in the United States and Mexico. Thalía stated in an interview that she also plans to expand the tour to Latin America, Europe and Asia if it meets positive commercial reception.

In October 2013, Thalía released in the United States and Latin America her fourth book Chupie (The Binky That Returned Home), and on 12 November, Thalía released in Mexico her second live album VIVA! Tour. This album was recorded on 27 April 2013, during her concert in Mexico City. In United States and Latin America, the album was released on 1 December 2013. It was certified gold in Mexico on its second week on the market for sales exceeding 30,000 copies.

On 5 December 2013, she received her own star in the Hollywood Walk of Fame as a recognition of her success.

2014–2015: Viva Kids and Amore Mio
On 25 March 2014, Thalía released her first children album Viva Kids Vol. 1 in Mexico. The album contains 11 songs and received one nomination to Latin Grammy Awards 2014.
Vamos A Jugar was the first single of the album and was released on 18 March 2014. Viva Kids Vol. 1 was released in US, on 5 June 2014.

On 22 July 2014, Italian singer Laura Pausini confirmed that by September that same year she would release a special version of her greatest hits album to the Hispanophone market, in an edition containing new duet with Thalía in Sino a ti.

On 9 September 2014, Thalía released the lead single of Amore Mio, "Por Lo Que Reste De Vida". The song debuted No. 50 in the Billboard Hot Latin Songs chart. The video music was released on 14 October 2014.

Thalía released her 12th studio album on 17 November 2014. Amore Mio was Thalía's second album that debuted at No. 1 on the Billboard Top Latin Albums chart. The album debuted at No. 173 on the Billboard 200 with 3,000 copies sold in first week in the US. In Mexico, the album debuted at No. 1. In December 2014, to celebrate Thalía's 25th anniversary as a solo artist, her first three albums were released as a digital download from iTunes and Spotify.

In January 2015, Thalía released her first fashion collection in United States with Macy's.

2016–2017: Latina, world tour, and directorial debut
On 26 February 2016, she revealed through her social media accounts the album cover for her then-upcoming studio album, Latina, which was released on 21 April 2016. The album's first single, "Desde Esa Noche" featuring Maluma, peaked at number 16 on the Hot Latin Songs chart and number 4 on the Latin Pop Airplay chart. The second single of the album, Vuélveme a Querer was released on 29 April 2016. The third single of album was Todavía Te Quiero featuring De La Ghetto was released on 2 December 2016.

Thalía has announced she will embark on a new tour, her third overall, called Latina Love Tour.

In 2017 she made her directorial debut when she co-directed "15: A Quinceañera Story", a four-part series of documentary shorts that follows five latina quinceañeras. For this she received a nomination for Outstanding Directorial Achievement in Children's Programs at the 70th Directors Guild of America Awards That same year she collaborated with Colombian singer Carlos Vives in the song "Todo Me Gusta" from his album "Vives". The song was not released as a single but still managed to peak at number 12 in Bolivia and also peaked at number 14 the U.S. Tropical Digital Songs Chart.

2018–2019:  Donna Summer Musical, Eyelure, Valiente, and Adria
In 2018 she produced Summer: The Donna Summer Musical on Broadway. The musical is based on the life of Donna Summer.

In August 2018 she released her false eyelash and eyebrow collection called Eyelure which is available at Walmart.

Thalía released her fourteenth studio album, Valiente, on 9 November 2018. The lead single No Me Acuerdo was certified quadruple platinum in both Mexico and the United States as well as double platinum in Spain. The album also spawned the hits Me Oyen, Me Escuchan, Lento, and Lindo Pero Bruto with the latter being certified gold in the United States. The album had a total of 8 songs released as singles.

In January 2019 she released her line of hair care products called Adria by Thalía. The 7 piece collection in available in stores at Walmart and Target as well as online.

2020–present: New collaborations, Viva Kids 2, and DesAMORfosis
In January 2020 Thalía released the single "Ya Tú Me Conoces" with Venezuelan brother duo Mau y Ricky. The song served as the lead single from her 17th studio album. A month after that she collaborated with Mexican duo Rio Roma on their song "Lo Siento Mucho", which entered the top 10 on the Mexican charts. A month later she collaborated again, this time with Brazilian drag queen Pabllo Vittar on the song "Tímida", which served as the fifth single from Vittar's album 111.

In May 2020, the magazine People en Español named her the number-one most influential Mexican star of all time for her success as a singer, actress, and entrepreneur. Later that month, she released her second children's album titled Viva Kids Vol. 2.

In June 2020 she collaborated with Peruvian singer Leslie Shaw on her single "Estoy Soltera", which also features Colombian singer Farina and served as the third single from Shaw's EP Yo Soy Leslie Shaw.

She released the second single of her upcoming studio album titled "La Luz" on 28 August 2020, on which she collaborated with Puerto Rican rapper Myke Towers. A month later she started on a Facebook watch series called Latin Music Queens alongside Sofía Reyes and Farina. The series would lead up to the release of two more singles with the first one being Ten Cuidao with Farina which premiered on episode three and the second single being Tick Tock which featured all three singers and premiered after the sixth and final episode. The latter also served as the third single from Thalía's upcoming album.

On 7 May 2021 she released Mojito which served as the fourth single from her album DesAMORfosis which she released on 14 May 2021.

Acting career
Thalia was cast in a supporting role in the 1986 telenovela Pobre señorita Limantour with which she began her collaboration with Televisa, the largest mass media company in the Spanish-speaking world. In 1987, she went on to star in her first major role for Televisa in the 1987 teenage drama series Quinceañera, along with Mexican actress Adela Noriega. Quinceañera won the TV y Novelas award for Best Telenovela of the Year 1988. In 1989, she got her first lead role in Luz y Sombra, which was less successful.

In 1992, Thalía shot to fame starring in María Mercedes, for which she won a TV Y Novelas Award for Best Young Actress in 1993. This series was her first of three telenovelas later called Las Tres Marias ("The Three Marías") for sharing the character name. Marimar began in 1994 and Maria la del Barrio in 1995. The third was the most commercially successful of her career and it remains her most iconic role, while Marimar is considered by some critics the best telenovela of all time. In 1999, Thalía starred in her last telenovela, "Rosalinda". All four telenovelas were basically based on the same rags to riches character.
With these telenovelas, Thalía became famous worldwide because of the extremely high ratings they achieved in more than 180 countries (especially the Philippines).

Although Thalía's presence in television is legendary, her presence in cinema is less important. She appeared for the first time in a movie when she was still a child in the 1979 film "La Guerra De los Pasteles" ("The War of the Cakes"). Furthermore, in 1999, she starred in "Mambo Café", a modest indie film production that had a poor reception from critics.

Cultural impact of telenovelas
Thalía has been labeled by various mass media companies as the "queen of soap operas", because her presence in television during the decade of the '90s was phenomenal. She became one of the world's foremost and most enduring television personalities as she starred in Mexico's highest-rated telenovelas ever that were exported in over 180 countries and viewed by about 2 billion people. It is stated by international media experts that at some point at the midst of the telenovela craze, Thalía's name even became synonymous with her native country, Mexico.

According to the newspaper Ivoir'Soir: "At 7.30 sharp in the evening, when Marimar comes on, everything stops in Côte d'Ivoire". It is also mentioned that "Marimar" could attract more local fans than the 1998 World Cup, and that the program arrived in Africa after being a phenomenal rating hit in Indonesia and the Philippines, where in 1997 she was received in Manila like a foreign head of state.

Thalía stated in her autobiography regarding to the impact of her telenovelas: "Soap operas made a lot of history; just look at the report by UNESCO, where it was noted that "in the Ivory Coast in Africa and in Paris (France), people stopped the daily course of their lives just to watch a soap opera. I never expected that kind of success [...] Whenever I arrived anywhere, I was treated like royalty; even the press in some of these countries referred to me as the Aztec Queen, the Mexican Queen, or the ambassador of Mexico, and like a proud peacock, I always brought my country's flag with me wherever I went to represent my motherland. I was in the clouds at the pinnacle of my career [...] During my visit at the Philippines, the organizers informed me that the last time so many people gathered in the streets for a person was when Pope John Paul the Second came to visit on January fourteenth, 1995 [...] In the Philippines, the country that probably felt the greatest impact from Marimar, the show was more widely promoted than the 1998 World Cup and more highly rated than the Super Bowl or the Grammys. In fact while I was visiting the country, the people and the media were so enthralled to see Marimar in the flesh that a historic peace treaty between the government and the guerillas and the centennial celebrations of the Philippine Revolutions that were happening at the same time were pushed aside in the midst of Marimar fever. As a result, the archipelago was temporarily dubbed "República de MariMar."

The phenomenon of Thalía's telenovelas also became visible in countries like Brazil, Bulgaria, Libya, Egypt, France, Greece, Hungary, Indonesia, Lebanon, Poland, Portugal, Romania, Russia, Syria, Turkey and the majority of Spanish-speaking countries around the world.

Business endeavours

Her first business endeavour started with a women's underwear line in 1993, and launched in 1995. It become a success in her native country. In 2002, Thalía signed a deal with Kmart to release her own clothing collection for women, as well as accessories and home products. In the middle of 2003, the "Thalía Sodi" collection was officially available in the US market in over 2,000 stores. Thalía commented: "My collection is a dream come true. I'm so happy to have created a clothing line inspired by my culture, trying to show the colors and the passion of our culture, that captures also a big part of my personal style". Thalía became the first Mexican woman to launch a clothing brand in the US.

Simultaneously, Thalía debuted her eyewear collection under the brand name "Thalía Eyewear Collection" in association with Kenmark Optical. In 2005, the line also became available in Mexico's market as Thalía signed a deal with "Devlyn" company. Up to 2007, Thalía had generated US$100 million from the sales of "Thalía Eyewear", with more than 1 million products sold. Precisely in 2007 Thalía presented a new eyewear collection in New York, and the brand was exported to over eighty countries around the world.

In April 2004, she entered the editorial market by releasing her own magazine Thalía in US, produced by American Media and oriented to the female Latin youth. The magazine included consultation and reports about issues like health, fashion and beauty. Some months later, in September, Thalía became the face of jewels' company Jacob & Co.

In 2004, she signed a contract with Hershey's with which she released her own chocolate and candy brand. In 2005, she designed a summer clothing line, and in the following year, she was converted into the face of "Carol's Daughter" company, specialized in beauty products, while in 2007 she launched her perfume, produced by "Fuller Cosmetics" company. In 2007, she joined ABC Radio and started her own radio show known as "The Conexión Thalía Radio Show", in which she discusses music, fashion, news and political issues, and invites various people to talk with her on different issues. The program, that is weekly and lasts two hours, premiered on 17 March 2007, and still goes on, while it has expanded to over 70 radio stations through the US.

In September 2007, she released the beauty advice book "Thalía: ¡Belleza!-Lessons in Lipgloss and Happiness" and in June 2009, she released her second book entitled "Thalia: ¡Radiante!-Your Guide to a Fit and a Fabulous Pregnancy". In May 2010, she revealed new accessories and jewels available via her website, apart from a new clothing line in association with multinational company C&A. In February 2011, she became the new face of Head & Shoulders and in November, she released her third book, which is her autobiography and named "Growing Stronger". Thalía has also been the public face of various advertisements, like Dr Pepper in 2001 or Victoria's Secret in 2005. According to Mira! magazine, in 2008 it was estimated that Thalía was one of the most wealthy Mexican businesswomen with a net worth of over US$100 million. In April 2012, she inaugurated her own yoga center in New York.

In 2015, she signed a contract with "ePura", a Mexican water company and she also signed an exclusive deal with Macy's to launch her apparel, shoes and jewelry collections. Jeffrey Gennette, Macy's president stated that "the Thalia Sodi collection is the biggest private-brand launch in the history of the company by a long shot."

Philanthrophy and activism

Thalía has participated in various humanitarian campaigns. Since 2004, she has been an official celebrity ambassador and volunteer of March of Dimes, to support national fundraising and awareness campaigns. March of Dimes is a United States nonprofit organization that works to improve the health of mothers and babies. Also, since 2016 she is a UNICEF Mexico Ambassador. Thalía is also became a member of "ALAS Foundation", which is a non-profit organization that strives to launch a new social movement that will generate a collective commitment to comprehensive Early Childhood Development programs for the children in Latin America.

Through various public service campaigns and through her own media channels, Thalia has been a strong voice for March of Dimes Prematurity Campaign. She also is featured in March of Dimes Education and Health Promotion materials in English and Spanish, while she has helped to raise awareness and critical funds for the March of Dimes year-round. Furthermore, she supports March for Babies and works to find ongoing opportunities for March of Dimes strategic alliances and media promotions.

In 2006, Thalía along with her husband attended the event A Funny Thing Happened on the Way To Cure Parkinson's with the aim to economically support the foundation The Michael J. Fox Foundation for Parkinson's Research of Michael J. Fox. In May 2009, Thalía and Tommy Mottola were recognized from St. Jude Children's Research Hospital in Miami for their support in children in need. In 2010, she reunited with other recording artists, performers and actors like Sharon Stone, Michael Douglas, Jennifer Lopez and Marc Anthony between others, to raise funds for the "Foundation of the New York's police department", which works for better urban security. In 2011, she attended a beneficial event in New York, organized by the Robin Hood Foundation with the aim to raise money for homeless youth. In the same year, she closed the Mexican Teleton by offering a live concert.

In November 2012, Thalía took humanitarian aid and comfort to compatriots of her in New York that were affected by Hurricane Sandy. She stated : "When I started seeing the destruction of Sandy I thought it was incredible, but, when I saw my Mexican brothers and sisters I felt the need to try and do something for them" in front of a group of families gathered at the Staten Island Immigrant Information Center in one of the most devastated by the storm areas. She went on to say that in times like this an artist should use the reach of the media to collect aid for the victims, and at the same time she called on the public to deposit money in the account opened by the Mexican Consulate for that purpose.

In April 2013, Thalía was awarded with the "Your Voice Inspires Many" award by the Lyme Research Alliance.

Personal life

Thalía was in a relationship with actor Fernando Colunga from 1995 to 1996 while they appeared on the series María la del Barrio. Thalía married music executive Tommy Mottola  on 2 December 2000. The couple have two children, a daughter born in October 2007, and a son born in June 2011. Thalía has stated in her autobiography and elsewhere that she is religious and believes profoundly in God. She began studying Kabbalah in 2002, using many of its symbols in the artwork of her album El Sexto Sentido. In 2015 she accidentally revealed during an interview that she had multiple miscarriages which caused her depression and were some of the hardest times in her life.

In September 2002, Thalía's sisters, Laura Zapata and Ernestina Sodi, were kidnapped in Mexico City. Zapata was released 18 days after her kidnapping, and her sister Ernestina was released on the 36th day. Thalía has had a series of familial conflicts, especially with her sister Laura Zapata. She has opted to keep her point of view regarding to her familial issues private, despite the attacks she has received from her older sister. In a press interview, Thalía stated that her familial problems with her sister are "just a dark cloud in a shiny sky".

In 2008, Thalía was affected by Lyme disease, a disease commonly transmitted by ticks. The illness prevented her from promoting her album Lunada, while it functioned as a motivation for her to have a totally different perspective towards life.
In reference to her illness, Thalía stated in her autobiography : "I would sweat profusely, soaking my pajamas, the sheets and even the mattress; everything hurt, even my hair, which, by the way, started to fall out. At times it felt as if my head were going to burst, as if there were lead inside of it; my eyes ached in their sockets....the hypersensitivity of my skin was so severe that sometimes I couldn't even handle the bed sheets."

Influences
According to Thalia herself, her major personal influence was her mother, who was a motivating manager for Thalia from the very beginning of her career until 2000. As for her artistic influences, Thalia's work is mostly influenced by Gloria Estefan, Celine Dion, Sade, Billie Holiday, Frank Sinatra, The Doors, and Kylie Minogue, while she has stated that she always admired Marilyn Monroe and Madonna. Thalia's first idol, according to her, was athlete Nadia Comăneci. She has even stated that her record-breaking performance was a huge motivation for her to follow a career in entertainment.

Cultural impact

She is referred as the "Queen of Latin Pop" by international media at least since the early-2000s, and was named by Billboard during the late-1990s as "Latin American's Reigning Music Queen". Thalía's success and impact in Latin music has been noted and praised by many critics. According to Billboard, she has achieved critical acclaim and commercial success as both a singer and songwriter, and has remained as one of the leading female artists in Latin music. Before her crossover attempt to the English market with a homonymous album in 2003, she gained success with her Spanish recordings in Europe, Asia and all over the Americas, even before the crossover of contemporaries artists such as Enrique Iglesias, Ricky Martin, Shakira and Paulina Rubio. She also stated: "My internationalization has come for several years ago and in Spanish, which is very significant". Thalía was included in Billboard list the "Greatest Latin Artists of All Time" in 2020.

According to the American magazine Ocean Drive, Thalía is "the biggest star Mexico has exported in the last decades". Similarly, Tammy Gagne in We Visit Mexico (2010) described her as "the most popular singer, actress, and dancer in Mexico", while Rough Guides discussed the Latin pop music stage in Latin America saying that in Mexico, "since the 1990s the biggest name has been Thalía". Univision placed Thalía at number 8 in their list of "25 most influential Mexican musicians", the highest peak by a female artist within the list.

Thalía has been also described as an influential Latin woman, and has been part of diverse listicles. For instance, People en Español included her in their book Legends: the 100 most iconic Hispanic entertainers of all time (2008). The same magazine, include her at their "The 25 Most Influential Latin Women" and Terra Networks named her one of the most "powerful and iconic women in music" in 2011. Leila Cobo from Billboard wrote she "has carved out one of the most successful global Latin careers in memory". Producer Emilio Estefan called her "Mexico's diva of divas" and stated "Thalía is one of the few female artists in the Latino market who has legions of fans throughout Latin America, including Brazil". In 1998, French company Louis Vuitton invited her to appear in Rebonds publication, being at the time the first Latin celebrity to appear in that book. In 1997, 25 April was declared by the government of Los Angeles, as "Thalia's National Day", because of her growing popularity among the Latino community in the United States.

Thalia's rise to international prominence coincided with the worldwide broadcast of the soap operas she starred in. Her soap operas were viewed in more than 180 countries by almost 2 billion viewers according to UNICEF, and many of her telenovelas became one of the most watched television broadcasts around the world. She is known as the "Queen of Telenovelas" ("Queen of Soap Operas") and Billboard once named her "the most widely recognized Spanish-speaking soap star in the world". She also gained success as a businesswoman, with commercial and critical recognition for her business ventures by launching several products under her brand name, and dominated the editorial business by writing and releasing three books, that became bestsellers. According to Felipe Escudero from El Mundo in 2006, Thalía was described as the "Latin Madonna of the Hispanic market" and a "Queen Midas" due her success as a businesswoman.

Thalía is considered a gay icon and according to Infobae, many of her fans recognized her as the "Latin queen of gay community". The same publication also stated Thalía is one of the most "emulated pop singers by transvestite shows in gay nightclubs". Andrés del Real from La Tercera felt she is an icon for the sexual minority, and professor Ramón García in Chicano Representation and the Strategies of Modernism (1997) wrote Thalía is "the dream identity of many drag queens". Ed Grant from Time also commented that many of them called themselves "Thalíos".

Thalia has been an influential artist for almost every younger Latin pop singer, including Anahí, Belinda, and urban Latin artists Becky G, Natti Natasha and Karol G among others, while Julio Iglesias, Tony Bennett, Juan Luis Guerra, Gloria Estefan, Ricky Martin, Laura Pausini, Tiziano Ferro, Michael Bublé, Espinoza Paz, Gloria Trevi, Inna, Erik Rubin, Pedro Capó, Maluma, Robbie Williams and many other artists have expressed their admiration towards her talent and charisma.

Awards and achievements 

Thalía has achieved multiple milestones during her career with her music, acting career and business ventures. Luis Magaña from El Universal commented that those record figures in her career are "impressive" and found that she has been the first in place of different situations in life.

Thalía has sold over 25 million records worldwide, and is one of the best-selling Latin music artists. She has numerous albums amongst the best-selling in Spanish-language that include En éxtasis, Amor a la Mexicana and Arrasando with sales of over 2 million copies worldwide and have at least one album amongst the best selling of all-time in Mexico, Chile and the Philippines. "No Me Acuerdo" is also one of the best-selling Latin singles in the United States. According to El Universal, Thalía is the first Latina to have a Top 10 in all continents, and Arrasando led her to be the first Latin woman selling a Spanish album in Japan. Thalía con banda is the first album of banda music with a certification in Spain.

Thalía's versatility signing in other languages made her the first and only Latin artist with an album recorded primarily in Tagalog when she released Nandito Ako in 1997. María la del Barrio is the first telenovela translated into the Tagalog language. Thalía became the first actress to make a trilogy of telenovelas and Quinceañera is considered to be the first telenovela for a teen audience. Moreover, Thalía is the highest paid actress in the history of Televisa. With El Sexto Sentido, Thalía set a record for the largest number of interviews granted to an electronic medium, Televisa. The album also became the first Spanish-language release in the United States to have a preorder campaign through iTunes and was the most expensive Spanish album up that time. She is also the first woman to have a HBO Latino concert special.

"Amor a la Mexicana" is the first Mexican song to be played in European dive bars. Thalía is also the first Mexican female artist to have a certification in Brazil, and remains the best-selling Mexican female soloist in that country. She is also the first Mexican woman with a line of clothing in the United States, as well the first Mexican woman closing bells at Nasdaq. Thalía became the first Mexican artist to hit one billion views on YouTube with "No Me Acuerdo". She also became in the first Mexican artist to have complete control over all the videos in her catalog. Thalía is the most followed Mexican female artist in Spotify, and with most views on YouTube. She also held the record in Instagram until being surpassed by Danna Paola.

She is the first recipient of the Star Award at the Billboard Latin Music Awards when she was honored in 2001. She received her own star in the Hollywood Walk of Fame in 2013 as a recognition to her versatile trajectory and her impact in the world of music and entertainment. In doing so, Thalía became the first female singer born in Mexico with that achievement. She also was the first Mexican singer and actress to receive a star in Miami (Calle 8, Walk of Fame) and in Venezuela she was the youngest artist to receive their walk of fame. She holds a record for appearing the most times in People en Españols annual list of the most beautiful Latin celebrities (Los más bellos). She became the first face of Jacob & Co, and the first Latina to make a deal with The Hershey Company.

Filmography

Discography

 Studio albums
 Thalía (1990)
 Mundo de Cristal (1991)
 Love (1992)
 En éxtasis (1995)
 Nandito Ako (1997)
 Amor a la Mexicana (1997)
 Arrasando (2000)
 Thalía (2002)
 Thalía (2003)
 El Sexto Sentido (2005)
 Lunada (2008)
 Habítame Siempre (2012)
 Viva Kids Vol. 1 (2014)
 Amore Mío (2014)
 Latina (2016)
 Valiente (2018)
 Viva Kids Vol. 2 (2020)
 Desamorfosis (2021)

 Live albums
 Primera Fila (2009)
 Viva Tour (2013)

Concert tours
 High Voltage Tour (2004)
 Viva! Tour (2013)
 Latina Love Tour (2016)

Written works

See also

 Sodi family
 List of most watched television broadcasts
 List of most expensive celebrity photographs
 List of UNICEF Goodwill Ambassadors
 List of best-selling female latin artists

References

Bibliography
 Scott Robert Olson (1999). Hollywood Planet: Global Media and the Competitive Advantage of Narrative Transparency, Routledge publications, pp. 134, 153–161. .
 Quiñones, Sam (2001). True Tales from Another Mexico: The Lynch Mob, the Popsicle Kings, Chalino, and the Bronx. University of New Mexico Press. .
 Cl. Fernandez, Andrew Paxman (2001). El tigre: Emilio Azcárraga y su imperio Televisa. .
 Ruth Lorand (2002). Television: Aesthetic Reflections, P. Lang, Michigan University, digitized in 2008. 
 Maria Immacolata, Vassallo de Lopes, Uribe Bertha (2004). Telenovela: internacionalização e interculturalidade, Edições Loyola. , πορτογαλικά.
 Cobo, Leila (2005). Billboard : "Thalía's Sixth Sense", Nielsen Business Media, Inc – Prometheus Global Media, pages 59–60. .
 Lisa Shaw, Stephanie Dennison (2005). Pop Culture Latin America!: Media, Arts, and Lifestyle, ABC-CLIO, pages 51, 233–239, 398. 
 Stavans Ilan, Augenbraum Harold (2005). Encyclopedia Latina: History, culture, and society in the United States. Volumen 1, Grolier Academic Reference. .
 Antoine van Agtmael (2007). The Emerging Markets Century: How a New Breed of World-Class Companies Is Overtaking the World, Simon and Schuster, p. 255. 
 
 
 Stavans, Ilan (2010). Telenovelas (The Ilan Stavans Library of Latino Civilization), ABC-CLIO. .

External links

 Thalia.com — Official website
 

 
1971 births
Living people
EMI Latin artists
Fonovisa Records artists
Mexican LGBT rights activists
Latin music musicians
Mexican women in business
Mexican women singers
English-language singers from Mexico
Portuguese-language singers of Mexico
Mexican child actresses
Mexican dance musicians
Mexican emigrants to the United States
Mexican record producers
Mexican telenovela actresses
Mexican women writers
Actresses from Mexico City
Singers from Mexico City
20th-century Mexican actresses
Timbiriche members
Latin pop singers
Singers from New York City
Sony Music Latin artists
Mexican women pop singers
21st-century American singers
21st-century Mexican businesswomen
21st-century Mexican businesspeople
21st-century Mexican women singers
21st-century Mexican singers
Mexican women record producers
Sodi family
Mexican people of Italian descent
Mexican people of French descent
People with acquired American citizenship
Women in Latin music